Panamá es Cultura y Valores is a Panamanian UCI Continental road cycling team founded in 2011.

Team roster

References

UCI Continental Teams (America)
Cycling teams established in 2021